Saint Patrick's Church, also called Old Straffan Church, is a ruined medieval church in Straffan, Ireland.

Location

St. Patrick's Church is located in the centre of Straffan village, 760 m (½ mile) north of the River Liffey.

History

St. Patrick’s Church, Straffan was built in the early 13th century. It is recorded that St Patrick's was incorporated into the Hospital of Saint John outside Newgate, Dublin c. 1250 which would suggest its construction at an earlier time.

The vicarage was suppressed in 1397 and was united with Saint John’s Hospital. In 1531 Archbishop John Alen restored the vicarage.

The church may have served as a safe house for persecuted clergy. The nave was ruined by 1630.

The church was replaced by the modern church in 1838.

The church is located within a modern graveyard, accessible by a lychgate, built c. 1920.

Building

The tower has a stair-turret in the southwest and has had later buttresses added to the north and south.

The entrance door is to the south with a modern granite arch; otherwise the church is of rubble with limestone dressings. There are three cusped, ogee-headed and chamfered single-light windows — two in the south and one in the north. There are roughly-dressed quoins on the east wall.

Most of the northern wall has fallen. A 19th-century account mentions a small stone oratory to the south, which has since been demolished.

Gallery

References

Religion in County Kildare
Archaeological sites in County Kildare
Former churches in the Republic of Ireland
Churches in County Kildare